Ridge Avenue Farmers' Market was a historic farmers' market building located in the Francisville neighborhood of Philadelphia, Pennsylvania. It was built in 1875, and was a one-story brick and brownstone building with basement.  It was an irregular rectangular shape, measuring 92 feet by 262 feet.  The Market was built in 1875. One of the founding members was Grant Webster. After his death, the management of the Market was assumed by his son, Harold J. Webster. Harold managed the Market until it closed in the 1970’s. It featured Gothic arched openings and a high peaked, wood open truss roof with jerkinhead end gables. It has been demolished and the property developed for housing.

It was added to the National Register of Historic Places in 1984.

Gallery

References

External links

Historic American Buildings Survey in Philadelphia
Commercial buildings on the National Register of Historic Places in Philadelphia
Gothic Revival architecture in Pennsylvania
Commercial buildings completed in 1875
Lower North Philadelphia